Richard King (born 27 November 2001) is a Jamaican footballer who plays as a defender for Cavalier.

Club career 
King plays for Cavalier FC in Jamaica.

International career 
King made his senior international debut for Jamaica against Peru and also feature in a WCQ match against Costa Rica.

Career statistics

Club

Notes

International

Honors

National Premier League

2021

References

2001 births
Living people
Jamaican footballers
Jamaica international footballers
Association football defenders
National Premier League players
Cavalier F.C. players